Nathan Leyder (born 14 April 1997) is a Belgian footballer who plays as defender for White Star Lauwe.

References

External links
Nathan Leyder at Footballdatabase

1997 births
Living people
Belgian footballers
Belgian expatriate footballers
Association football defenders
Eerste Divisie players
AFC Ajax players
Jong Ajax players
Belgian expatriate sportspeople in the Netherlands
Expatriate footballers in the Netherlands
Sportspeople from Namur (city)
Footballers from Namur (province)